Ricardo Alex Costa Santos (born January 6, 1975 in Salvador da Bahia) is a beach volleyball player from Brazil.

Santos won the silver medal in the men's beach volleyball competition at the 2000 Summer Olympics with partner Zé Marco de Melo. Santos also represented his native country at the 2004 Summer Olympics in Athens, Greece. There he claimed the gold medal, teaming up with Emanuel Rego, with whom he won the world title in October 2003.  The same pairing went on to win the bronze medal at the 2008 Summer Olympics.

At the 2012 Summer Olympics, he teamed with Pedro Cunha, but they lost in the quarter finals.

References

External links

 Ricardo Santos at the Association of Volleyball Professionals
 
 
 
 
 

1975 births
Living people
Brazilian men's beach volleyball players
Beach volleyball players at the 2000 Summer Olympics
Beach volleyball players at the 2004 Summer Olympics
Beach volleyball players at the 2008 Summer Olympics
Beach volleyball players at the 2012 Summer Olympics
Olympic beach volleyball players of Brazil
Olympic gold medalists for Brazil
Olympic silver medalists for Brazil
Olympic bronze medalists for Brazil
Olympic medalists in beach volleyball
Medalists at the 2004 Summer Olympics
Medalists at the 2008 Summer Olympics
Beach volleyball players at the 2007 Pan American Games
Sportspeople from Salvador, Bahia
Medalists at the 2000 Summer Olympics
Pan American Games gold medalists for Brazil
Pan American Games medalists in volleyball
Medalists at the 2007 Pan American Games
21st-century Brazilian people